Mark Anthony Crocker (born 26 May 1956) is a Hong Kong former freestyle and backstroke swimmer. He competed at the 1972 Summer Olympics and the 1976 Summer Olympics. Educated at Island School, he trained at the Harry Wright swim club. He then enrolled at the University of Alabama.

References

External links
 

1956 births
Living people
Hong Kong male backstroke swimmers
Hong Kong male freestyle swimmers
People educated at Island School
Olympic swimmers of Hong Kong
Swimmers at the 1972 Summer Olympics
Swimmers at the 1976 Summer Olympics
Commonwealth Games competitors for Hong Kong
Swimmers at the 1974 British Commonwealth Games
Swimmers at the 1978 Commonwealth Games
Alabama Crimson Tide men's swimmers
Place of birth missing (living people)